Katharina Fink (born 14 November 2002) is an Italian badminton player affiliated with SSV Bozen. She won the National Championships title in 2018. Fink clinched her first senior international title at the 2019 South Africa International in the women's doubles event partnered with Yasmine Hamza. Together with Hamza , they won the silver medal at the 2022 Mediterranean Games.

Early life 
Fink was born into a German-speaking region in Italy called South Tyrol. She is half Czech on her mother's side and quarter Swiss, quarter Italian on her father's. Fink began to playing badminton at the age of ten. In her junior career, she trained at the Südtirol Badminton School, and entered top 200 BWF World ranking in the women's doubles event in 2021.

Achievements

Mediterranean Games 
Women's doubles

BWF International Challenge/Series (2 titles, 6 runners-up) 
Women's singles

Women's doubles

  BWF International Challenge tournament
  BWF International Series tournament
  BWF Future Series tournament

BWF Junior International 
Girls' singles

Girls' doubles

  BWF Junior International Grand Prix tournament
  BWF Junior International Challenge tournament
  BWF Junior International Series tournament
  BWF Junior Future Series tournament

References

External links 
 

2002 births
Living people
Sportspeople from Bolzano
Italian female badminton players
Competitors at the 2018 Mediterranean Games
Competitors at the 2022 Mediterranean Games
Mediterranean Games silver medalists for Italy
Mediterranean Games medalists in badminton
21st-century Italian women